Anthony McWhirter (6 September 1872 – 1932) was a Scottish footballer who played in the Football League for Bolton Wanderers.

References

1872 births
1932 deaths
Scottish footballers
English Football League players
Association football midfielders
Great Lever F.C. players
Partick Thistle F.C. players
Bolton Wanderers F.C. players
Manchester City F.C. players